The Mogollon Baldy Lookout Cabin, in Gila National Forest on Mogollon Baldy peak, in New Mexico, was built in 1923.  It was listed on the National Register of Historic Places in 1988.

It is a log cabin close to the lookout tower near the peak. The listing does not include the lookout tower itself.

NRHP photos but not NRHP nomination doc:

It is located on Mogollon Baldy, a peak in the Mogollons.

References

External links

Fire lookout towers on the National Register of Historic Places in New Mexico
National Register of Historic Places in Catron County, New Mexico
Buildings and structures completed in 1923